Dass (also known as Barawa) is an Afro-Asiatic dialect cluster spoken in Bauchi State and Plateau State, Nigeria.

Varieties
Blench (2019) lists varieties as belonging to the Dass cluster:

Durr–Baraza
Zumbul
Wandi
Dot

References 

West Chadic languages
Languages of Nigeria